Miroszláv Zsdrál (born 18 January 1991) is a Hungarian football player who currently plays for Pécsi Mecsek FC.

Club statistics

Updated to games played as of 1 June 2014.

External links
 HLSZ 
 MLSZ 

1991 births
Living people
Sportspeople from Pécs
Hungarian footballers
Association football midfielders
Pécsi MFC players
Kozármisleny SE footballers
Nemzeti Bajnokság I players